Sproull is a surname. Notable people with the surname include:

Bob Sproull (born c. 1945), American computer scientist
Charlie Sproull (1919–1980), American baseball player
Hayley Sproull (born 1989), New Zealand comedian, scriptwriter and television show host
Robert Sproull (1918–2014), American academic, physicist and United States Department of Defense official